USS Salute may refer to the following ships of the United States Navy:

  was laid down on 11 November 1942 by Winslow Marine Railway and Shipbuilding Co., Seattle, Washington
  was laid down on 17 March 1953 by the Luders Marine Construction Co., Stamford, Connecticut

References 

United States Navy ship names